Saint Nicholas Church (Danish: Sankt Nikolaj Kirke), also Bogense Church, is located in the harbour town of Bogense on the Danish island of Funen. It was built in 1406 on the remains of a 12th-century Romanesque church. In the mid-15th century, various additions were made including the tower which unusually is at the east end of the church. The tall spire served as a landmark for shipping. Comprehensive restoration work was completed in 2010. Artefacts include a 16th-century altar (1588), a 13th-century baptismal font, and a carved pulpit from 1604.

References

Romanesque architecture in Denmark
Churches completed in 1406
Churches in the Region of Southern Denmark
Buildings and structures in Nordfyn Municipality
Lutheran churches converted from Roman Catholicism
15th-century churches in Denmark
Churches in the diocese of Funen